Minesing Wetlands, previously known as Minesing Swamp, is a Ramsar boreal wetland in central Ontario, Canada stretching from the western periphery of Barrie to Georgian Bay. It was identified and classified through the International Biological Program. It is "the largest and best example of fen bog in southern Ontario", one of the "most diverse undisturbed wetland tracts in Canada" and is a provincially significant Area of Natural and Scientific Interest. The term minesing is of Ojibwe origin and means "island", referring to an island located within Lake Edenvale, which encompassed the present-day wetlands and surrounding areas.

The swamp's hydrology "provides for an interconnected network of swamps, fens, bogs and marshes". It acts as a reservoir that absorbs floodwater during spring thaw, from which a slow and steady flow is released throughout the summer into the Nottawasaga River system. This also prevents spring flooding of Wasaga Beach.

The remainder is owned by the Ministry of Natural Resources, the Simcoe County, and private landowners. It straddles the three townships of Clearview, Essa and Springwater.

It provides habitat to over 400 plant species, of which 11 are provincially rare. Minesing Wetlands is an important staging area for thousands of migratory waterfowl, and is the largest wintering ground for white-tailed deer. It supports numerous plant species which are at the extremities of their natural range, including those indigenous to the arctic tundra in the north and the Carolinian forests to the south, and is home to the "largest pure stand of silver maple in the province". Provincially rare birds indigenous to the swamp include the blue-winged warbler, prothonotary warbler, cerulean warbler, golden-winged warbler and the blue-grey gnatcatcher.

Minesing Wetlands is a popular recreation area which draws many tourists. Canoeing is a common activity in the area, though inexperienced canoeists should be wary of spring flooding.

Research
A number of research projects are conducted throughout Minesing Wetlands. An analysis of the hydrology of wetland systems in the swamp began in the mid-1990s, with primary goals to "characterize the water balance of a selected plot within the fen" and to examine "the correlations between vegetation and hydrology".

Notes

References

External links
 History of Minesing

Landforms of Simcoe County
Ramsar sites in Ontario
Areas of Natural and Scientific Interest
Wetlands of Ontario
Protected areas of Simcoe County